Dapoxetine, marketed as Priligy, among others, is a medication used for the treatment of premature ejaculation (PE) in men 18–64 years old. Dapoxetine works by inhibiting the serotonin transporter, increasing serotonin's action at the postsynaptic cleft, and as a consequence promoting ejaculatory delay. As a member of the selective serotonin reuptake inhibitor (SSRI) family, dapoxetine was initially created as an antidepressant. However, unlike other SSRIs, dapoxetine is absorbed and eliminated rapidly in the body. Its fast-acting property makes it suitable for the treatment of PE, but not as an antidepressant.

Originally created by Eli Lilly pharmaceutical company, dapoxetine was sold to Johnson & Johnson in 2003 and submitted as a New Drug Application to the Food and Drug Administration (FDA) for the treatment of PE in 2004. Dapoxetine is sold in several European and Asian countries, and in Mexico. In the US, dapoxetine has been in phase III development. In May 2012, USA-based Furiex Pharmaceuticals reached an agreement with ALZA Corp and Janssen Pharmaceutica to market dapoxetine in the USA, Japan, and Canada, while selling the rights to market the drug in Europe, most of Asia, Africa, Latin America, and the Middle East to Menarini.

Medical uses

Premature ejaculation
Randomized, double-blind, placebo-controlled trials have confirmed the efficacy of dapoxetine for the treatment of PE. Different dosages have different impacts on different types of PE. Dapoxetine 60 mg significantly improves the mean intravaginal ejaculation latency time (IELT) compared to that of dapoxetine 30 mg in men with lifelong PE, but no difference is seen in men with acquired PE. Dapoxetine, given 1–3 hours before sexual episode, prolongs IELT and increases the sense of control and sexual satisfaction in men of 18 to 64 years of age with PE. Since PE is associated with personal distress and interrelationship difficulty, dapoxetine provides help for men with PE to overcome this condition.
With no drug approved specifically for treatment for PE in the US and some other countries, other SSRIs such as fluoxetine, paroxetine, sertraline, fluvoxamine, and citalopram have been used off-label to treat PE. Waldinger's meta-analysis shows that the use of these conventional antidepressants increases IELT two- to nine-fold above baseline, compared to three- to eight-fold when dapoxetine is used. However, these SSRIs may need to be taken daily  to achieve meaningful efficacy, and their comparatively longer half-lives increase the risk of drug accumulation and a corresponding increase of adverse effects such as reduced libido. Dapoxetine, though, is generally categorized as a fast-acting SSRI. It is more rapidly absorbed and mostly eliminated from the body within a few hours. These pharmacokinetics are more favorable in that they might minimize drug accumulation in the body, habituation, and side effects.

Depression and anxiety 
Although it was initially thought of as unsuccessful in its intended use as an antidepressant, dapoxetine has been more recently investigated as a possible aid to one approach to depression treatment focused on stress reduction, based on an animal model of depression.

Contraindications

Dapoxetine should not be used in men with moderate to severe hepatic impairment and in those receiving CYP3A4 inhibitors such as ketoconazole, ritonavir, and telithromycin. Dapoxetine also cannot be used in patients with heart failure, permanent pacemaker, or other significant ischemic heart disease. Caution is advised in men receiving thioridazine, monoamine oxidase inhibitors, SSRIs, serotonin-norepinephrine reuptake inhibitors, or tricyclic antidepressants. If a patient stops taking one of these drugs, he should wait for 14 days before taking dapoxetine. If a patient stops taking dapoxetine, he should wait for 7 days before receiving these drugs.

Adverse effects
The most common effects when taking dapoxetine are nausea, dizziness, dry mouth, headache, diarrhea, and insomnia. Discontinuation due to adverse effects is dose related. According to McMahon in recent study in Asia, the rate of discontinuation is 0.3%, 1.7%, and 5.3% of 1067 studied subjects with placebo, dapoxetine 30 mg, and dapoxetine 60 mg, respectively. Unlike other SSRIs used to treat depression, which have been associated with high incidences of sexual dysfunction, dapoxetine is associated with low rates of sexual dysfunction. Taken as needed, dapoxetine has very mild adverse effects of decreased libido (<1%) and erectile dysfunction (<4%).

Overdose
No case of drug overdose has been reported during clinical trials.

Interactions

With phosphodiesterase inhibitors (PDE5 inhibitors) 
Many men who have PE also suffer from erectile dysfunction (ED). Treatment for these patients should consider the drug–drug interaction between dapoxetine and PDE5 inhibitors such as tadalafil (Cialis) or sildenafil (Viagra). In Dresser study (2006), plasma concentration of 24 subjects was obtained. Half of the sample pool were treated with dapoxetine 60 mg + tadalafil 20 mg; the other half were treated with dapoxetine 60 mg + sildenafil 100 mg. These plasma samples were then analyzed using liquid chromatography-tandem mass spectrometry. The results showed that dapoxetine does not alter the pharmacokinetic of tadalafil or sildenafil.

With ethanol 
Ethanol does not affect the pharmacokinetics of dapoxetine when taking concurrently.

Mechanism of action
The mechanism through which dapoxetine affects premature ejaculation is still unclear, but dapoxetine is presumed to work by inhibiting serotonin transporter and subsequently increasing serotonin's action at pre- and postsynaptic receptors. Human ejaculation is regulated by various areas in the central nervous system (CNS). The ejaculatory pathway originates from spinal reflex at the thoracolumbar and lumbosacral level of spinal cord activated by stimuli from male genitalia. These signals are passed on to the brain stem, which then is influenced by a number of nuclei in the brain such as medial preoptic and paraventricular nuclei. Clement's study performed on anaesthetized male rats showed that acute administration of dapoxetine inhibits ejaculatory expulsion reflex at supraspinal level by modulating activity of lateral paragigantocellular nucleus (LPGi) neurons. These effects cause an increase in pudendal motoneuron reflex discharge (PMRD) latency, though whether dapoxetine acts directly on LPGi or on the descending pathway in which LPGi located is unclear.

Pharmacokinetics
Absorption
Dapoxetine is a white powder substance and water-insoluble. Taken 5-6 before sexual activity, it is rapidly absorbed in the body. Its maximum plasma concentration (Cmax) is reached 1–2 hours after oral administration. The Cmax and AUC (area under the plasma vs. time curve) is dose dependent. The Cmax and Tm (time needed to obtain the maximum plasma concentration) after single doses of dapoxetine 30 mg and 60 mg are 297 and 498 ng/ml at 1.01 and 1.27 hours, respectively.
A high-fat meal does reduce the Cmax slightly, but it is insignificant. In fact, food does not alter dapoxetine pharmacokinetics. It can be taken with or without food.
Distribution
Dapoxetine is absorbed and distributed rapidly in the body. Greater than 99% of dapoxetine is bound to the plasma protein. The mean steady-state volume is 162 L. Its initial half-life is 1.31 hours (30 mg dose) and 1.42 hours (60 mg dose), and its terminal half life is 18.7 hours (30 mg dose) and 21.9 hours (60 mg dose).
Metabolism
Dapoxetine is metabolized extensively in the liver and kidney by multiple enzymes such as CYP2D6, CYP3A4, and flavin monooxygenase 1. The major product at the end of the metabolic pathway is circulating dapoxetine N-oxide, which is a weak SSRI and contributes no clinical effect. The other products presented less than 3% in the plasma are desmethyldapoxetine and didesmethydapoxetine. Desmethyldapoxetine is roughly equipotent to dapoxetine.
Excretion
The metabolites of dapoxetine are eliminated rapidly in the urine with a terminal half-life of 18.7 and 21.9 hours for a single dose of 30 mg and 60 mg, respectively.

Safety and tolerability
Cardiovascular safety
The cardiovascular safety profile of dapoxetine has been studied extensively during the drug development. Phase I trials showed that dapoxetine had neither clinically significant electrocardiographic effects nor delayed repolarization effects, with dosing up to four-fold greater than the maximum recommended dosage, which is 60 mg. Phase III studies in men with PE showed a safety and well tolerated profile of dapoxetine with dosing of 30 and 60 mg. No cardiovascular adverse had been found.
Neurocognitive safety
Studies of SSRIs in patients with major psychiatric disorders prove that SSRIs are potentially associated with certain neurocognitive adverse effects such as anxiety, akathisia, hypomania, changes in mood, or suicidal thought. No study on the effects of SSRIs in men with PE has been done.  McMahon's study in 2012 showed that dapoxetine has no effect on mood and is not associated with anxiety or suicidality.
Withdrawal syndrome
The incidence of antidepressant discontinuation syndrome symptoms in men using dapoxetine to treat PE has been described by reviewers as low or no different from the incidence of such symptoms in men withdrawn from placebo treatment. The lack of chronic serotonergic stimulation with on-demand dapoxetine minimizes the potentiation action of serotonin at synaptic cleft, thus decreasing the risk of discontinuation symptoms.

Synthesis

Currently, very few methods are used to synthesize (S)-dapoxetine. This novel approach consists of only six steps in which three main steps are shown above. The initial reactant is trans-cinnamyl alcohol, which is commercially available. Sharpless asymmetric epoxidation and Mitsunobu reaction have been used to produce expected (S)-dapoxetine. The overall yield is 35%. This method is considered a good choice compared to the known methods due to high yield and easily obtainable reactants.

Regulatory history

Dapoxetine was created by Eli Lilly and in phase I clinical trial as an antidepressant. It never worked out well as a medication for the treatment of depression, though, and was shelved for a while before subsequently developed to treat PE. In December 2003, Eli Lilly sold the patent for dapoxetine to Pharmaceutical Product Development (PPD) for US$65 million. Eli Lilly may also receive royalties payment from PPD if the sale exceeds a certain amount. Research into the effectiveness of dapoxetine was revisited in 2020.

ALZA is the current owner of dapoxetine, but PPD will receive milestone payments and drug royalties from ALZA. If approved, dapoxetine will be marketed in the US by Ortho McNeil pharmaceutical, Inc. Ortho McNeil and Janssen-Ortho Inc, or Janssen-Cilag are all units of Johnson & Johnson.
As at 2005, dapoxetine was in phase III clinical trials, pending review by the FDA.

Dapoxetine has been marketed and approved in more than 50 countries. Dapoxetine has been approved in Italy, Spain, Mexico, South Korea, and New Zealand in 2009 and 2010; marketed in Sweden, Austria, Germany, Finland, Spain, Portugal, and Italy. It has also been approved in France, Russia, Malaysia, Philippines, Argentina, and Uruguay.

See also

Serotonin transporter
Serotonergic system
Serotonin receptors

References

Dimethylamino compounds
Eli Lilly and Company brands
Johnson & Johnson brands
Selective serotonin reuptake inhibitors
Urology
Naphthol ethers